Fareham College is a further education college situated on a  campus on the western side of the town of Fareham in Hampshire, England.

History
Fareham College was formed in 1984 as a merger between an earlier technical college (Fareham Technical College) on the same site and the sixth-form college at the historic Price's School, a boys' grammar school on Park Lane, (before the latter's site was sold to developers), and became the sole state provider of post-16 education in Fareham (a tertiary college). Price's School became a sixth form college in 1976. Fareham Grammar School for Girls was on Birdwood Grove, and became Cams Hill School.

Principals
 Peter Watkins, Principal from 1980-74 of Price’s Sixth Form College (Head from 1974-9 of Chichester High School For Boys and from 1969-74 of King Edward VI Five Ways)
 Carl Groves (2002-2011)
 Nigel Duncan (2012– ??)
 Andrew Kaye ( ??-

Academic performance 
The latest Ofsted report (2017) rated Fareham College as an 'Outstanding' college.

Alumni

Price's School
 Neil Astley, who founded Bloodaxe Books
 Rear-Adm Roger Dimmock CB, commanded HMS Hermes from 1982-3, and RNAS Culdrose from 1980-2
 Robert Goddard (novelist)
 Peter Long, businessperson

References

External links
 College website
 Former Price's School
 EduBase

Fareham
Further education colleges in Hampshire
Educational institutions established in 1984
1984 establishments in England